The Royal Australian Navy, although a significant force in the Asia-Pacific region, is nonetheless classed as a medium-sized navy. Its fleet is based around two main types of surface combatant, with limited global deployment and air power capability. However, in 2009, a white paper, Defending Australia in the Asia Pacific Century: Force 2030, was produced by the Australian government which set out a programme of defence spending that will see significant improvements to the RAN's fleet and capabilities.

Future vessels 
The following is a list of vessels currently ordered or under construction for the Royal Australian Navy:

The following is a list of vessels currently planned for the Royal Australian Navy:

Surface combatants

Anzac-class FFH 

The Anzac class is the main surface combatant of the Royal Australian Navy. The first unit was commissioned in 1996 and the last entered service in 2006. Starting in November 2003, all eight frigates underwent extensive upgrades under Project SEA 1448 Phase 2, the Anzac Ship Anti-Ship Missile Defence upgrade. Completed in two phases, the following systems were upgraded and installed:
 Upgrade to the Saab Systems 9LV 453 Combat Management System.
 Installation of a SAGEM Vampir NG Infra-Red Search and Track System capable of detecting anti-missile and low-flying aircraft near land.
 Installation of an Australian CEAFAR S-band phased array radar and CEAMOUNT X-band multi-channel phased array missile illuminator to deliver enhanced target detection and better tracking, allowing Evolved Sea Sparrow missiles to engage multiple targets simultaneously.
 Installation of an I-Band navigation radar to replace existing target indication and Krupp Atlas 9600 radar systems.
Final Operating Capability is scheduled for October 2017. The vessels are expected to remain in service until 2032 where they will be replaced with up to nine frigates designed primarily for anti-submarine warfare.
Further upgrades under the so-called AMCAP upgrade include the replacement of the ageing Air Search Radar capability with the new CEAFAR L-band long-range air search radar. Designed and produced by CEA Technologies, this new radar technology will also be part of the combat system on board the Hunter-class frigates which will replace the Anzac-class frigates. Other major work as part of AMCAP upgrade include: 
 Upgraded ventilation systems; new sewage systems;
 Improvements to the Control and Monitoring System; 
 Engine modifications to improve power and efficiency;
 New communications suite (SEA1442);
 Upgraded LESCUT;
 Upgraded AN/SLQ-25C torpedo self-defence systems; and 
 Technical insert for the Saab 9LV 453 combat management system moves its operating system from Windows to Linux.

Hobart-class DDG 

The most significant project recently completed for the RAN are three Hobart-class air warfare destroyers to replace the Adelaide-class frigates. Although the 2009 Defence White Paper and original contract suggested that a fourth ship may be ordered, the 2016 Defence White Paper concluded that only three would be built. Each destroyer will be fitted with the Aegis combat system and will be based on the F100 design by Spanish shipbuilding company Navantia. Each vessel will be fitted with cruise missiles and the SM-6 anti-aircraft missile.  was commissioned on 23 September 2017, with the following vessels to be delivered in 2018 and 2019. The destroyers are being built by ASC Pty Ltd, although the project involves a significant amount of work sub-contracted to other companies and locations. The destroyers are to be named Hobart, Brisbane and Sydney. Future upgrades to this class includes an upgraded Aegis Combat System with an Australian developed tactical interface which will be the same as on the Hunter-class FFG. Future potential upgrades include the integration of the SM-6 and the replacement of the RGM-84 Harpoon anti-ship missile. The government will invest up to $5.1 billion in upgrades to the Hobart-class destroyer combat management system upgrades at Osborne from 2024.

Hunter-class FFG 
With the Anzac-class frigates due to begin retiring in the late 2020s, work on a replacement program has begun. The program is expected to cost AU$35 billion and a request for tender for the vessel design was released in March 2017 to three contenders: Navantia, Fincantieri, and BAE Systems as part of a competitive evaluation process. In June 2018, Prime Minister Malcolm Turnbull announced that a variation of the BAE design had been selected as the preferred tender for the s. Construction will begin in Adelaide, South Australia in 2020. Australian shipbuilding company ASC Shipbuilding will become a subsidiary of BAE Systems Australia for the duration of the build.

Amphibious warfare

The RAN's amphibious capabilities was greatly increased by a new class of two Canberra-class amphibious vessels. These ships, based on Navantia's Strategic Projection Ship (later commissioned into the Spanish Navy as ), displace approximately 27,000 tonnes, can transport 1,000 personnel and 150 vehicles, and can transport these ashore through landing craft carried in a well deck, or helicopters, with up to six operating simultaneously from each ship's flight deck. The two ships replaced the  amphibious vessels.  was to be replaced by a strategic sealift vessel of 10,000 to 15,000 tons displacement, which will provides the capacity to transport equipment, supplies, helicopters, and soldiers into zones of operation, and embark or disembark these without port facilities. .In the 2016 defence white paper it revealed that HMAS Choules would fulfill this role. Following the early decommissioning of both Kanimblas and Tobruk being out of action, multiple ships were purchased and or leased to cover the lack of amphibious capability. The RAN planned also replace the six Balikpapan-class heavy landing craft with six larger vessels.

Minor vessels
Between 1999 and 2003, the RAN acquired six s. Based on Intermarine's s, each ship is equipped with a variable depth sonar, and a pair of Bofors Double Eagle underwater clearance vehicles.

The first of these, was commissioned in June 2005, and was the first of fourteen. , the last ship of the class was commissioned in 2008.

The multi-role ships are predicted to displace anywhere up to 2,000 tonnes, and may be equipped with a helicopter or unmanned aerial vehicle. However the 2016 Defense White Paper decreased the amount of planned vessels to twelve and stated that they would only replace the Armidales while the other classes would see life-extension work. Lurssen's OPV 80 design was chosen. The class was named  (OPV). The first ship will be named .

During the 2019 election campaign, Scott Morrison announced that one hydrographic survey ship and two minehunters would be constructed from the mid 2020s in the Henderson Shipyard Precinct Under SEA 1905 and SEA 2400. SEA 2400 Hyrdographic Data Collection Capability Program which includes the introduction of a Strategic Military Survey Capability (SMSB) to replace the Leeuwin-class survey vessels. While SEA 1905 is the acquisition of a further two Arafura-class offshore patrol vessels in a mine counter-measures configuration.
This was expanded in the 2020 Defence Strategic Update and 2020 Force Structure Plan released on the 30 June 2020 for up to 8 vessels optimised for mine countermeasures and hydrographic survey roles potentially based on the Arafura design.

The Government announced that six evolved s from Austal to be built in Henderson, Western Australia will be acquired for A$350 million on 1 May 2020 to boost patrol capability.

Submarines 

The s, the first of which entered service in 1996, are due to receive a major upgrade to their combat systems, with technology based on the US Navy's . This new system will be introduced in conjunction with the new heavyweight torpedo.

In the longer term, the Collins-class submarines will begin to reach the end of their useful life in 2026. To meet an in-service date of 2026, advanced design work on the next generation of Australian submarines will begin by 2014–2015. The submarines are likely to be Australian-built, conventional submarines equipped with air independent propulsion and advanced combat and communications systems. Defence Minister Joel Fitzgibbon ordered planning to begin on the next generation of submarines to replace the Royal Australian Navy's Collins-class fleet. The 17-year project will be the largest, longest and most expensive defence acquisition since Australia's Federation, potentially costing up to $25 billion. The submarines are expected to be capable of carrying long-range cruise missiles and midget-subs.

According to the 2009 Defence White Paper, the submarine fleet is to be expanded to 12. The submarines will be equipped with cruise missiles and the world's most advanced torpedoes, sonars, combat systems, intelligence gathering systems as well as also being able to support special forces operations. The first submarine is expected to be in service by 2030. The 2009 White Paper predicted the cost of the new submarines at $35 billion.

Collins class
To avoid a capability gap prior to the anticipated entry into service of the first of 12 Attack-class submarines, Defence Minister Peter Dutton has confirmed that all 6 of the Collins-class submarines will undergo major life-of-type extensions (LOTEs). Approximately $6 billion would be invested in the program. It is expected to involve rebuilding each submarine once it achieves 30 years of service, with each upgrade scheduled to take approximately two years.

Attack class

In 2018, Naval Group's Shortfin Barracuda design was chosen as the design for the new vessels. The Attack-class submarines were expected to replace the older Collins class from mid 2030s. The project was cancelled on 15 September 2021 in favour of a nuclear powered submarine using US and UK nuclear submarine technology.

SSN-AUKUS

On 15 September 2021, Australian, US, and UK leaders announced the AUKUS agreement which included the construction of nuclear powered submarines for the RAN. A specific plan for the acquisition of nuclear-powered submarines was outline in March 2023 and will proceed in three phases.

In the first phase RAN personnel will be trained by the US and UK, while Australia develops submarine shipyard infrastructure and maintenance facilities. Starting in 2027 the US and UK will deploy Virginia-class and Astute-class submarines to Australia as part of "Submarine Rotational Force West". The second phase, starting from 2032, will then see the RAN acquire three Virginia-class submarines, with the option to acquire two more. The final phase will involve Australia and the United Kingdom jointly developing the SSN-AUKUS. Australia will build five SSN-AUKUS boats by 2055 and eight by the mid 2060s.

Afloat Support
Supply, replaced the former support ship  in April 2021, while Stalwart replaced the fleet oiler  in November 2021. Supply and Stalwart are based on the Navantia built Spanish Navy's replenishment vessel .

The 2020 Defense Strategic Update And 2020 Force Structure Plan announced the planned procurement of two new additional multi-role sealift and replenishment ships, a replacement of the ADV Ocean Protector, a large salvage and repair vessel, a replacement for STS Young Endeavour youth training ship and a new vessel to support the Pacific Step-Up. The two announced multi-role sealift and support ships - Project Sea2200 - would be domestically built and replace HMAS Choules and enhance the logistical support of the RAN.  As of May 2022 BMT Group was the sole company having submitted a proposal based on their ELLIDA design, adapted from the Royal Fleet Auxiliary designated as Tide Class, however the Damen Group reportedly had also shown interest in submitting a design based on their Joint Support Ship class.

Fleet Air Arm

The Fleet Air Arm is currently an all rotary winged organisation. The RAN operates 6 MRH-90 helicopters shared with the Australian Army, and 23 MH-60R "Romeo" Seahawk helicopters.

The US government has approved a possible sale of up to 12 additional MH-60R helicopters to the RAN. This is part of the RAN plan to expand and rationalise its support and logistics helicopter fleet by replacing the 6 MRH-90s and operating only one type of helicopter to ease maintenance and training. In May 2022, the Morrison government announced that it would purchase 12 MH-60Rs to replace the MRH-90 fleet and a 13th to replace a MH-60R that was ditched in the Philippine Sea in October 2021. In September 2022, the Albanese government placed an order for 12 MH-60Rs.

List of major projects
(Updated to reflect changes made in the Defence Capability Plan – June 2011 Supplement)
JP 2048 – Amphibious Deployment and Sustainment program
Phase 5:   replacement – 6 new LCH design
RFI assessment completed. RFP to be issued early 2012.
As of 2019 no further developments.
Sea 1000 – Design and Procurement of Future Submarine
Phase 1 & 2: Phase 1 (Design) and Phase 2 (Acquisition) has been combined. Decision not due until 2017–2020 or so.
Sea 1180 – Arafura-class offshore patrol vessel.
Sea 1360 –  Maritime Extended Range Air Defence (Standard SM-6 for )
Phase 1: Project definition stage. Budget for capability reduced from $1–$2b to $500m-$1b.
Sea 1439 – Installation of new combat system for s
Phase 4A: Replacement Combat System.
Currently underway, IOC has been achieved and FOC expected by 2013.
Replacement system is the same AN/BYG-1v8 system fitted to the  SSN.
Phase 4B: Weapon & Sensor Enhancements.
Currently underway.
Phase 6: Sonar Replacement.
Given first-pass approval.
Sea 1448 – Anzac-class frigate capability upgrades
Phase 2B: Anzac-class Anti-Ship Missile Defence upgrade
 successfully completed trials of ASMD upgrade in July 2011.
The upgrade of the other seven  frigates has been given government approval. The upgrade is due to begin early 2012 and be complete by 2017.
Phase 4A: ES system improvement given first-pass approval.
Phase 4B: AN/SPS-49 (Air Search Radar) replacement budget increased from $100–$300m to $300–$500m.
RFI released.
Sea 1654 – Maritime Operational Support Capability
Phase 3:  replacement
Second vessel of the class, commissioned in November 2021.
Sea 5000 – Future Frigate Program – ( replacement)
Phase 1: Project definition stage. Contract awarded to BAE Systems Australia June 2018, 9 ships to enter service 2027 - 2042
SEA 1905 is the acquisition of a further two Arafura-class offshore patrol vessels in a mine counter-measures configuration.
SEA 2400 is the Hydrographic Data Collection Capability Program which includes the introduction of a Strategic Military Survey Capability(SMSB) to replace the Leeuwin-class survey vessels.
SEA 2200 - Future Joint Support Ship
Initial designs sought for two Joint Support Ships to replace HMAS Choules and be construct domestically.

A full listing of all current Projects is available at the Defence Materiel Organisation website.

Recently completed projects 
JP 3030 – HMAS Choules procurement
JP 2048 – Amphibious Deployment and Sustainment program
Sea 4000 – Design and procurement of new Air Warfare Destroyers
Air 9000 – Future Naval Aviation Combat System

See also
 Future of the Royal Navy
 Future of the Indian Navy
 Future of the Russian Navy

Notes

Royal Australian Navy
Military acquisition